William Hall may refer to:

Actors
William Brad Hall (born 1958), American actor
William Hall (actor), American actor
William Hall Jr., American actor

Military
William Hutcheon Hall (1797–1878), British naval officer
William Hall (VC) (1821–1904), Canadian royal naval hero
William Henry Hall (1842–1895), first Director of Naval Intelligence of the Royal Navy
William Preble Hall (1848–1927), U.S. Army Brigadier General and Medal of Honor recipient
William Reginald Hall (1870–1943), British naval officer and MP
William Evens Hall (1907–1984), U.S. Air Force Lt. General and member of the Reserve Officers Association (ROA) Minuteman Hall of Fame
William E. Hall (1913–1996), U.S. naval aviator and Medal of Honor recipient

Politicians
William Hall (governor) (1775–1856), American politician, governor of Tennessee 
William Augustus Hall (1815–1888), U.S. Representative from Missouri
William Sprigg Hall (1832–1875), American lawyer and politician
William H. Hall (1869–1922), American politician
William Reginald Hall (1870–1943), British naval officer and MP
William Samuel Hall (1871–1938), dentist and Canadian federal politician
William Lorimer Hall (1876–1958), lawyer, judge and political figure in Nova Scotia, Canada
William Hall (Australian politician) (1902–1963), Australian politician
William O. Hall (1914–1977), American diplomat

Engineers and scientists 
William Brenton Hall (1764–1809), physician
William Whitty Hall (1810–1876), American physician, writer and editor of health magazines
William Hammond Hall (1845–1934), American civil engineer
William Bateman Hall (1923–2003), Professor of Nuclear Engineering at the University of Manchester
William Hall (virologist), Irish chair of medical microbiology and professor

Sports
William Hall (cricketer, born 1853) (1853–1911), English cricketer
William Hall (cricketer, born 1878) (1878–?), English cricketer
Billy Hall (rugby) (1889–1964), English rugby union and rugby league footballer of the 1910s, and 1920s for Gloucester (RU), Great Britain (RL), England, and Oldham
Bill Hall (pitcher) (1894–1947), American Major League Baseball (MLB) pitcher
Bill Hall (catcher) (1928–1986), American MLB catcher
Billy Hall (Australian footballer) (1915–2002), Australian rules football
Bill Hall (utility player) (born 1979), American MLB utility player
Will Hall (American football) (born 1980), American football coach
William Hall (basketball) (born 1991), British basketball player

Others
William Hall (poet) (1748–1825), English poet and antiquarian
William Hall (publisher) (1800–1847), English publisher who with Edward Chapman founded Chapman & Hall
William Shakespeare Hall (1825–1895), English settler and explorer in Australia
William Edward Hall (1835–1894), English lawyer and mountaineer
William Knight Hall (1855–1900s), English political activist
William James Hall (1860–1894), Canadian missionary to Korea
William Preston Hall (1864–1932), American showman, businessman, and circus impresario
William Weeks Hall (1894–1958), American artist, photographer and art critic.
William Hall, 2nd Viscount Hall (1913–1985), Welsh surgeon and businessman
William Hall (Lord Lieutenant) (born 1934), Northern Irish businessman, farmer and public servant
Will Hall (born 1966), mental health advocate, writer, and counselor
The Bill Hall Trio, a musical comedy act

See also
Willie Hall (disambiguation)